These are statistics for the first season of the Suomensarja held in 1936.

Overview
The 1936 Suomensarja  was contested by 13 teams divided into 2 regional sections. The 2 top teams from each section then participated in a promotion play-off group with VIFK Vaasa and UL Turku eventually gaining promotion with the former finishing as champions.

League tables

Itäsarja (Eastern League)

Länsisarja (Western League)

Nousukarsinnat (Promotion Playoffs)

See also
Mestaruussarja (Tier 1)

References

Suomensarja
2
Fin
Fin